Naahar Singh Basnyat was a soldier who fought against the forces of Mir Qasim. He was eldest son of Shivaram Singh Basnyat. He fought against Kings of Kathmandu valley. He fought against Tibet in 1845 B.S.

References

Year of birth missing
Year of death missing
Nepalese military personnel
Basnyat family
18th-century Nepalese nobility
People of the Nepalese unification